University College Hospital, Ibadan is a federal teaching hospital in Ibadan, Nigeria attached to the University of Ibadan.

History
The University College Hospital, (UCH) Ibadan was established by an August 1952 Act of Parliament in response to the need for the training of medical personnel and other healthcare professionals for the country and the West African Sub-Region. The establishment of the Hospital followed a Visitation Panel in 1951 to assess the clinical facilities for the clinical postings of medical students registered for M.B.B.S. degree of the University of London. The visitation panel, led by Dr. T.F. Hunt of the University of London rejected the enhanced facilities provided by the Government/Native Authority Hospital at Adeoyo, Ibadan following the establishment of a Faculty of Medicine in the University College, Ibadan (now University of Ibadan) in 1948.
 
The university College Hospital (UCH) was strategically located in Ibadan, then the largest city in West Africa which is also the seat of the first University in Nigeria. The physical development of the Hospital commenced in 1953 in its present site and was formally commissioned after completion on 20 November 1957. The University College Hospital, Ibadan was initially commissioned with 500-bed spaces. Currently, the hospital has 1,000 bed spaces and 200 examination couches with occupancy rates ranging from 65 to 70%.
 
The hospital, at inception in 1957, prior to the Act of Parliament, had two clinical Departments (Medicine and Surgery). However, the hospital has evolved to accommodate about 65 Departments among which is the first Department of Nuclear Medicine in Nigeria commissioned by the former Honourable Minister of Health, Professor Eyitayo Lambo on 27 April 2006. The Hospital and the University of Ibadan, function in excellent symbiosis and it is impossible to think of one without the other, in the areas of health manpower training,  research and clinical service. This functional interdependence was emphasized from inception through the appointment of the Chairman of the Provisional Council of the University College, (now University of Ibadan as the first chairman of the Board of Management of the University College Hospital, Ibadan.
 
In addition to undergraduate medical programme (Based in the College of Medicine of the University of Ibadan), the UCH also provides for: Postgraduate Residency Training  Programmes in all specialties of Internal Medicine, Surgery, Obstetrics & Gynecology, Pediatrics, Otorhinolaryngology, Ophthalmology, Anesthesia, Orthopaedic Surgery and Traumatology, Laboratory Medicine, Psychiatry, Community Medicine, Family Medicine, Radiology, Radiation Oncology, Neurological Surgery and Dentistry. The University College Hospital also provides diploma /professional programmes in the School of Health Records & Statistics, Environmental Health Officers Tutors Course; Primary Health tutors Course, Nurse/Midwife/Public Health Nurse, Nurse Tutors Course, Post registration Courses in nursing e.g.  Peri Operative nursing and Occupational Health Nursing. 
 
The hospital is primarily a tertiary institution with appendages of community-based outreach activities at Igbo Ora, Abedo, Okuku, Sepeteri, Elesu, and Jago where it offers primary and secondary health care services. The hospital has about 65 service and clinical departments and runs 96 consultative out-patient clinics a week in 50 specialty and sub-specialty disciplines. In addition to the College of Medicine, the Hospital "houses" a Virology Research laboratory, a W.H.O Collaborating Centre in Immunology and an Institute of Advanced Medical Research and Training.(IAMRAT). The hospital also houses the Special Treatment Clinic (STC), a state-of-the-art clinic for research, training, and treatment of Sexually Transmitted Diseases and runs clinics for people living with HIV/AIDS. Accreditation has been given for the setting up of a department of nuclear medicine whilst approval has also been given by the Federal Ministry of Health for the establishment of an Institute of Neurosciences. Satellite Pharmacies are provided on each specialty floor for easy access for the procurement of drugs for patients on admission. A Pain Clinic and a Hospice Service are also on site for the care of terminally ill patients.
The hospital also houses the first and only Geriatric Centre in sub-Saharan Africa, the Chief Tony Anenih Geriatric Centre (CTAGC).

Since its inception, the hospital has trained over 6,000 Doctors, 501 Dentists, 4,513 Nurses, 2307 Midwives, 471 Peri-Operative nurses, 1062 Laboratory Scientist, 576 Environmental Health officers Tutors, 451 nurse/midwives/Public health educators, 326 Primary Health Care Tutors, 590 Community Health Officers, 640 Physiotherapists, 551 Health information Management Personnel (formally referred to as Medical Records Officers).As a result of the breakdown of primary healthcare facilities in the region, the hospital, though a tertiary healthcare facility, still caters for a lot of the primary and secondary healthcare burden. The patients' turn out in the  Emergency Department of the  Hospital averages 6500 annually and about 150,000 new patients are seen in the various out-patient clinics every year. 
In 2001, the million clientele mark was attained. Due to the aforementioned facilities, manpower and track records, the Hospital enjoys a wide patronage of both national and international clientele. 
 
The management of the Hospital spurred by the Federal Government's efforts in refurbishing the teaching hospital has taken steps to widen the scope of services provided by the resuscitation of the open heart surgical procedure of the hospital. In May 2006, a surgical team successfully performed open-heart surgery on three paediatric patients, an important landmark in medicine in Nigeria.!
Further, the hospital has performed 38 more open heart surgeries on patients with acquired and congenital heart diseases since then with 100% success rate.

Schools
 Health Information Management
 Medical Laboratory Science
 School of Nursing and Midwifery
 Occupational Health Nursing
 Preoperative Nursing
 Federally Funded Schools

Chief Medical Directors
The Chief Medical Directors of the University College Hospital since its founding are as follows:
 Professor Ebenezer Oluwole Akande
 Professor Abiodun O.K. Johnson
 Professor Benjamin O. Osuntokun
 Professor Olajide Ajayi
 Professor Michael O. Olatawura
 Professor Abiodun Ilesanmi 2003-2011
 Professor Temitope O. Alonge 2011-2019
Professor Jesse Abiodun Otegbayo 
March 1, 2019 until date web|url= http://m.dailytimes.com.ng/article/we-can-deal-ebola—uch-ibadan#.VEOhUXM1jqA|title =We can deal with Ebola - UCH Ibadan|date=8 August 2014|publisher =Daily Times|location=Nigeria|accessdate=18 October 2014}}</ref>

Controversy 
The hospital management was accused of covering up a rape incident of a medical student by a resident doctor despite forensic evidence.

Rape is a criminal offence, therefore, it can only be handled by a court of competent jurisdiction. The University College Hospital carried out an investigation, led by the current Provost of the College of Medicine, University of Ibadan. The Provost is a woman, and their report found the "victim" culpable. The report has since been forwarded to the Vice Chancellor, University of Ibadan, where the "victim" is a student, and to whom she reported the incident. A copy of the report was given to her lawyer. She was rightly advised to institute a criminal charge against the suspect, which has not been done until date. University College Hospital has no right or powers to try cases of rape or any criminal charge for that matter. It is also important to note that the doctor in question has since left the service of the University College Hospital. Instead of the social media war, the victim is advised to approach a court for justice.

See also 
 Kofoworola Abeni Pratt, the hospital's first Nigerian Matron

Photo Gallery

References

External links

University College Hospital, Ibadan website
College of Medicine, University of Ibadan, website
University of Ibadan, Ibadan website

Hospital buildings completed in 1957
Buildings and structures in Ibadan
University of Ibadan
Ibadan
Teaching hospitals in Nigeria
Hospitals established in 1952
1952 establishments in Nigeria
20th-century architecture in Nigeria